Modern telecommunications in Thailand began in 1875 with the deployment of the first telegraph service. Historically, the development of telecommunication networks in Thailand were in the hands of the public sector. Government organisations were established to provide telegraph, telephone, radio, and television services, and other government agencies, especially the military, still control a large estate of radio and television spectra. Private telecommunication operators initially acquired concession agreements with state enterprises. For mobile phone services, all the concessions have been amended by successive government to last 25 years have gradually ended in 2015. For other services, the concession terms and conditions vary, ranging from one to fifteen years. Nearly all of the concessions are build-operate-transfer (BTO) contracts. The private investor has to build all the required facilities and transfer them to the state before they can operate or offer services to public.

Liberalisation took place in the 1990s and 2000s. State enterprises, the Telephone Organization of Thailand, Communications Authority of Thailand, and Mass Communication Organization of Thailand, were corporatised in 2003 and 2004. The Constitution of 1997 prompted the institutional changes when it declared that all the spectrum is a "national communication resource for public welfare". The 1997 Constitution further requires the establishment of "an independent regulator" who shall be authorized to allocate spectra and monitor and regulate communications in Thailand. In 1998, to comply with the constitutional mandate, the parliament passed a law establishing two independent regulators, the National Telecommunication Commission (NTC) and the National Broadcasting Commission (NBC). The regulatory practice began in Thailand when the NTC was appointed by the king through the complex nomination procedure in 2005. The inception of NTC automatically terminates and transfers all power and authority in telecommunication sector from the Post and Telegraph Department (PTD) to the newly established independent commission.

In September 2006, the military wrested control from a civilian government and merged the telecommunications and broadcasting regulators into a convergence regulator. The task had not been completed when a civilian government came into power and introduced the new bill. The new law dubbed the Act on Spectrum Allocation Authority, Regulatory & Control over Radio & TV Broadcast and Telecommunications of 2010 (aka NRA Act of 2010), eliminated the NTC and created a new "convergence regulator" to manage both telecommunications and broadcast in Thailand. The new law also requires that the National Broadcasting and Telecommunications Commission which was established in 2010 as an independent regulator, must allocate all commercial spectrum licenses via auction. In 2012, in order to license the 3G spectrum and services, the Telecom Commission (TC) hosted a spectrum auction which resulted in three new licenses for 2.1 GHz to three incumbents (AIS, True, and DTAC). In 2013, the Broadcast Commission (BC) auctioned 42 new DTTV licenses.  Both auctions together earned record sums for money paid to the public sector via auction. Later the record was beaten by another auction by sister agency, the Broadcast Commission who launched the DTTV auction in December 2013. The NBTC Act in force then allowed NBTC to keep the proceeds of the DTTV auction. But when the military took over the country, it amended the NBTC Act to require return of auction proceeds to the treasury.

On 22 May 2014 when the coup d'état took place, the military decided that it would scrutinize the regulatory practices of both sectors. The government, led by General Prayut Chan-o-cha, announced that his government would move Thailand into the "digital economy" and would transform the Ministry of Information and Telecommunications into a Digital Economy Ministry. NBTC reform would be a part of the plan. In June 2014, the junta issued two new orders demanding that a) all the proceeds from spectrum auctions must be returned to the public purse and, b) all community radio stations must comply with a new junta order which would require examination and investigation of compliance before offering programming to the public.  Temporary licenses were issued in September 2014 to compliant radio stations that  signed voluntary memoranda of understanding (MOU) as "a condition precedent" to be able to broadcast while awaiting more thorough vetting from BC before issuance of the de juré license. The time required to an investigation was ambiguous. New community radio licenses must be in compliance with a junta order that supersedes the Radio and Television Act of 2008.

The mobile network market is dominated by three large operators who have a market penetration rate of 100 percent. All main mobile operators now utilise GSM/3GPP family technologies including GSM, EDGE, UMTS, and LTE. Thailand has six analogue terrestrial television channels, and 24 commercial digital terrestrial channels began broadcasting in 2014.

Under the Trade Competition Act 2017, which became effective in October 2017, the trade competition authority relinquished its authority to regulate specific sectors including broadcasting and telecommunications businesses. In other words, since the Trade Competition Act 2017 became effective, the broadcasting and telecom sectors that used to be regulated by specific legislation on trade competition have been exempted from complying with general competition laws and are only subject to sectoral regulations on competition. However, although the Trade Competition Act (“TCA”) BE 2560 (2017), states that the TCA does not apply to sectors that have specific legislation (i.e.: Banking, Broadcasting and Telecom), the Telecommunications Business Act (“TBA”) B.E. 2544 (2001) – Section 21 states: “In the telecommunications business operation, other than being subject to the law on trade competition…”. Therefore, a merger in the telecom sector for example, would be under both acts and authorities, because the specific legislation (The Telecommunications Business Act) points back to the law on trade competition.

Telephone

Fixed-line
There are three fixed-line telephone operators in Thailand: state-owned TOT Public Company Limited (now known as National Telecom (NT)), True Corporation, and TT&T (Currently name "3BB"). As of 2014, there were 5,687,038 fixed-line subscriptions. That number has been in decline since 2008.

The first fixed-line telephone system was installed in Thailand (Siam) under the Ministry of Defence in 1881, and later its operation was transferred to the Post and Telegraph Department. The Telephone Organization of Thailand (TOT) was established in 1954 to manage the telephone system.

The penetration of telephone remained relatively limited for most of the 20th century. In 1992, the ratio of telephone lines per population was 3.3 lines per 100 population. In 1991, two private corporations were given concessions to build and operate telephone lines: Telecom-Asia (later renamed True Corporation) for the Bangkok Metropolitan Region and Thai Telephone & Telecommunications (TT&T) for the provinces.

Mobile networks
As of 2014, there were 97.6 million mobile subscribers in Thailand, a penetration rate of 146 percent of the total population. The Thai market is predominantly prepaid with 84.8 million prepaid subscribers. More than 99 percent of the market share belongs to three large operators (including their subsidiaries): Advanced Info Service (AIS), 46.52 percent market share, DTAC, 28.50 percent market share, and Truemove, 24.26 percent. Other operators include the state enterprises TOT Public Company Limited (TOT) with 0.57 percent market share, and CAT Telecom with 0.15 percent market share and Mobile Virtual Network Operators (MVNOs).

In 1980s and 1990s, private mobile operators were given concessions from TOT and CAT. TOT and CAT were corporatised in 2002–2003, and the Thai telecommunications landscape transitioned towards spectrum allocation by independent regulator. The 2007 constitution and the Act on Organization to Assign Radio Frequency and to Regulate the Broadcasting and Telecommunications Services include the provisions that a national independent regulator is established and frequencies for commercial activities must be allocated via auction. The first successful spectrum auction by the National Broadcasting and Telecommunications Commission was organised in 2012, allocating 45 MHz of IMT (2100) frequency band to three mobile phone operators.

Legislation that governs the Mobile networks includes the Act on the Organisation to Assign Radio Frequency and to Regulate Broadcasting and Telecommunications Services 2010 (the NBTC Act) and the Telecommunications Business Act 2001 (the Telecommunications Business Act). Additionally, any operator wishing to issue telephone numbers shall obtain a separate licence from the NBTC, subject to a Telecommunications Numbering Plan issued by the NBTC.

In 2015 the NBTC arranged two rounds of auctions for 1800 MHz and 900Mhz. In November, Advance Info Service and True Corporation won the 1800 MHz license in the auction which takes nearly 33 hours to complete. In December, True Corporation and Jasmine International won the 900 MHz auction. The significance of this auction is the establishment of Jasmine International in the telecommunication business which didn't have a new player for many years. There are many rumours following this auction questioning Jasmine International on its ability to pay the license fee to NBTC.

In 2017, the number of mobile subscribers has reached 121.53 million, and in 2018 has already reached 125.6 million. To purchase a SIM card in Thailand, it is necessary to present an ID to register.

At the end of 2021, the total number of mobile subscriptions in Thailand was 99.4 million, representing a mobile penetration rate of 150 percent of the total population. More than 96.5 percent of the total market share belongs to three large operators (including their subsidiaries): Advanced Info Service (AIS), 44.38 percent market share, Truemove, 32.44 percent and DTAC, 19.68 percent market share. Other operators include the state enterprises National Telecom (NT) with 3.45 percent market share, and mobile virtual network operators (MVNO) with 0.05 percent market share, resulting in a (HHI) of 3,421

On November 22, 2021, Telenor and Charoen Pokphand Group, officially announced they have agreed to explore a USD 8.6 billion merger plan between Thailand’s second and third largest telecom operators (by subscribers), True Corporation (TRUE) and Total Access Communication (DTAC) – The proposed merger is subject to regulatory approvals. The merger was "acknowledged" by the regulator NBTC at a meeting on October 20, 2022. The newly merged company still retain the True Corporation name, which was founded on March 1, 2023 and it was listed on the Stock Exchange of Thailand under the stock ticker symbol TRUE on March 3, 2023.

Mobile Virtual Network Aggregator
On 25 June 2018, the National Broadcasting and Telecommunications Commission (NBTC), awarded a Type 1 Mobile Virtual Network Aggregator (MVNA) license to the Mobile virtual network enabler (MVNE) company One Development Co.,Ltd.

Numbering

Fixed-line telephone numbers have nine digits, while mobile numbers have ten digits, both including the trunk prefix "0".

Radio
AM: 204
FM: 334, shortwave 6 (1999)

There are 13.96 million radios in use (1997). But there were some cases like in this year (2015), expecting there will be more than 25 million radios are in use as of now.

Television

There are six free-to-air analogue terrestrial television stations in Thailand:

 Channel 3, operated by BEC World under concession from MCOT
 Channel 5, operated by the Royal Thai Army
 Channel 7, operated by BBTV, under concession from the Army
 Channel 9 MCOT HD, operated by the corporatised state-owned enterprise MCOT
 NBT, operated by the Thai government (Via The Government Public Relations Department, Office of the Prime Minister of Thailand)
 Thai PBS, a statutory public service broadcaster
 PPTV owned by Bangkok Media & Broadcasting 

The transition to digital terrestrial television began in 2014. The National Broadcasting and Telecommunications Commission arranged an auction for commercial television licenses in December 2013. The spectrum are allocated to four groups of commercial television services: seven high-definition  general licenses, seven standard-definition general licenses, seven news station licenses, and four children-and-family licenses. In addition, spectrum are allocated for 12 national public services channels and 12 regional community channels. The commercial licensees began experimental broadcasts on 1 April 2014.

Internet

Submarine cables
There are five submarine cables used for communications landing in Thailand. Thailand has cable landing points in Satun, Petchaburi and Chonburi.

 SEA-ME-WE-3, SEA-ME-WE-4 linking South East Asia to the Middle East and Western Europe. SEA-ME-WE 4 was operational since 2006.
 Thailand-Indonesia-Singapore (TIS) operational since December 2003.
 APCN linking Thailand, Malaysia, Singapore, Indonesia, Hong Kong, Philippines, Taiwan, Korea and Japan. The cable is operational since 1996.
 Thailand-Vietnam-Hong Kong (T-V-H) operational since February 1996.
 Flag Europe-Asia (FEA) operational since mid-1990s.

The Asia-America Gateway (AAG) is under construction and is in service since November 2009.

The Asia Pacific Gateway (APG), a new submarine cable, is under planning stage and is expected to be operational in Q3 2014.

Satellite

Thaicom is the name of a series of communications satellites operated out of Thailand and the name Thaicom Public Company Limited, which is the company that owns and operates the Thaicom satellite fleet and other telecommunication businesses in Thailand and throughout the Asia-Pacific.

The official name of satellite project known as THAICOM named by His Majesty the King Bhumibol Adulyadej, as a symbol of the linkage between Thailand and modern communications technology.

Thailand-based Shinawatra Computer and Communications Co. Ltd. (now InTouch Group) signed a US$100 million contract with Hughes Space and Communications Company Ltd. in 1991 to launch Thailand's first satellite communications project. The first Thaicom satellite was launched on December 17, 1993. This satellite carried 12 C-band transponders coveting a region from Japan to Singapore. Thaksin Shinawatra sold Shin Corporation, which owns 41% of Thaicom Public Company Limited.

Telecommunications regulatory environment in Thailand

National Broadcasting and Telecommunications Commission (NBTC)

The NRA Organization Act of 2010 established the new National Broadcasting and Telecommunications Commission (NBTC) in December 2010 as a single converged regulator for the telecoms and broadcasting sectors in Thailand.

The Telecommunications Business Act of 2001 laid down the rules for Thailand's telecommunications industry by requiring telecoms operators to obtain a license from the National Broadcasting and Telecommunications Commission (NBTC). The Act classifies telecommunication licenses into three categories. 
 Type-one telecom license is for an operator without its own network. 
 Type-two telecom license is for an operator with or without its own network but provides services targeting a segment or even several segments of the public. 
 Type-three telecom license is for an operator with a network that provides services to the general public. 
The 2001 Act was amended in 2006 under the supervision of Prime Minister Thaksin Shinawatra to allow foreigners to own a larger holding in a Thai telecommunications business.

In 2001, foreigners were not permitted to apply for type-two or type-three licenses under Thailand's Foreign Business Act (FBA).

The applicant applying for type two and type three licenses must be organizations where Thai nationals hold at least 75% shares and at least three quarters of the applicant's firm directors and the person authorized to sign any binding commitments as a representation of the applicant firm must be Thai nationals.

The 2006 amendments repealed all the additional requirements of an applicant of type-two and type-three licenses, stating foreigners can now hold up to 49% in a telecommunications operator of type-two or type-three; no restrictions on the number of their foreign directors’ representation; and the authorized person signing binding commitments as a representation of the applicant firm can be a foreigner.

The telecoms license fee is composed of three types of fees - permission for license, renewal and an annual fee.

As of June 2013 the NBTC has granted 186 telecoms licensees, listed as follows: 
 144 type-one licensees 
 7 type-two licenses without own network 
 10 type-two licenses with own network 
 25 type-three licenses

As of December 2018 the National Broadcasting and Telecommunications Commission (NBTC) had issued 58 MVNO licenses, however only 9 had launched.

See also

Media of Thailand
Censorship in Thailand

References